Nelson Haven is an extensive area of mudflats northeast of Nelson, New Zealand. It is separated from Tasman Bay / Te Tai-o-Aorere by the Boulder Bank and over 8 km long and up to 2 km wide. The area is regularly completely drowned and exposed by tidal action and supports a large population of mud crabs.

Notes

Coastline of New Zealand
Wetlands of New Zealand